Glenea pagana is a species of beetle in the family Cerambycidae. It was described by Per Olof Christopher Aurivillius in 1926.

References

pagana
Beetles described in 1926